The Sind cricket team was an Indian domestic cricket team representing the British Indian province of Sind. The team played in the Ranji Trophy from 1934–35 season until 1947–48 season in British India, before the partition of India.

The team first played first-class cricket in Ranji Trophy in the 1934 season against Western India team. The team continued to appear in the Ranji Trophy until the 1947/48 season, when it played its final first-class match against Bombay. Following the independence and partition of India, the Sind team was succeeded by the Sindh cricket team which went on to represent the Sindh province of Pakistan.

Notable players
 Naoomal Jeoomal
 Gogumal Kishenchand
 Jenni Irani
 Gulabrai Ramchand
 Pananmal Punjabi

References

External links
Sind cricket team at CricketArchive

Indian first-class cricket teams
Former senior cricket clubs of India
Cricket in Sindh
1893 establishments in India
Cricket clubs established in 1893